The 2014 NCAA Division II football season, play of college football in the United States  organized by the National Collegiate Athletic Association at the Division II level, began on September 4, 2014 and concluded with the National Championship Game of the NCAA Division II Football Championship on December 20, 2014 at Sporting Park in Kansas City, Kansas.  CSU Pueblo won the national title with a 13–0 win over Minnesota State. This was CSU Pueblo's first national title.

Conference changes and new programs

Membership changes

Azusa Pacific, Shorter, and Southern Nazarene completed their transitions to Division II and became eligible for the postseason. McMurry chose in January 2014 to abandon their transition to Division II in favor of a return to Division III, but still completed their Lone Star Conference schedule as planned.

Conference standings

Super Region 1

Super Region 2

Super Region 3

Super Region 4

Postseason

The 2014 NCAA Division II Football Championship Postseason involved 24 schools playing in a single-elimination tournament to determine the national champion of men's NCAA Division II college football.
The tournament began on November 22, 2014 and concluded on December 20, 2014 with the 2014 NCAA Division II National Football Championship game at Sporting Park in Kansas City, Kansas.

Format 
Six teams selected per super regional made up the field of 24 teams.

Eight first-round games were conducted on the campus of one of the competing institutions. In addition, two teams per super regional earned first-round byes. The first-round winners advanced to face a bye team in their super regional in the second round on the campus of team that received the bye. Second-round winners met in the quarterfinals at various campus sites. Quarterfinal winners advanced to play in the semifinals on the campus of one of the competing institutions. The championship took place at Sporting Park.

Bracket

* Home team    † Overtime    Winner

See also
2014 NCAA Division I FBS football season
2014 NCAA Division I FCS football season
2014 NCAA Division III football season
2014 NAIA football season

References